Baudh State, also known as  Boudh State, was one of the princely states of India during the period of the British Raj. It was recognized as a state in 1874 and had its capital in Boudh town. Its last ruler signed the accession to the Indian Union on 1 January 1948.

History
According to traditions, after the fall of the Somavamshi dynasty to Eastern Gangas, local chieftains were installed in the region as feudatories. Upon time, a childless Brahmin chieftain adopted the nephew of the neighbouring Raja of Keonjhar who belonged to the Bhanj dynasty. This prince styled himself Ananga Deva and founded the state in the 14th century.

See also 
Eastern States Agency
Political integration of India

References

Princely states of Odisha
History of Odisha
Boudh district
14th-century establishments in India
1948 disestablishments in India